The SmartQ 5 is a budget mobile Internet device manufactured by the Chinese company Smart Devices. It was officially announced 11 February 2009.

Overview
The SmartQ 5 comes with a custom version of Ubuntu Linux installed which is adapted for use with a touchscreen. It uses the LXDE desktop environment.

Ubuntu's main pre-installed applications are:

Midori web browser
FBReader e-book reader
Claws email client
SMPlayer multimedia player
Abiword word processor
Gnumeric spreadsheet
Transmission torrent client
 Sonata music player
Pidgin instant messenger
Evince PDF/document reader
rgbPaint painting program
GDebi package installer
PCMan File Manager
It is possible to install another Linux besides the default OS. Several Linux distributions like Mer and a ported Android support the SmartQ 5.

Smart Devices has obtained a Windows CE 6.0 royalty, the OS has been made available on the official site. Although a license from Microsoft needs to be purchased to activate Windows CE.

Specifications
 Samsung Mobile Application Processor S3C6410 based on ARM11 core at 667 MHz/800 MHz 
 128MB DDR 133/333 MHz SDRAM
 1GB NAND FLASH (256 MB usable for storage)
 AC97 audio codec & PCM 24-bit audio
 SoC graphics unit, OpenGL ES 1.1/2.0, 4M triangles/sec @133Mhz (Transform only)
 Integrated Wi-Fi 802.11b/g
 Integrated Bluetooth 2.0 + EDR
 800x480 resolution resistive touchscreen LCD, 4.3", 16.7 million colors
 SDHC card slot (up to 32 GB)
 Headphone  output power up to earphone 40 mW, frequency Response 20 Hz-20.000 Hz SNR 94dB
 Internal microphone
 USB 2.0 OTG port (480Mbit/s)
 Runs Ubuntu Linux
 2000mAH rechargeable lithium polymer battery
 Dimensions: 120x74x14mm
 Weight: 160 g

See also
SmartQ 7
SmartQ V5
SmartQ V7
SmartQ R7

References

External links
 Official English Smart Devices site
 Main English Community offering a blog, a board and a wiki
 Android Covia Forum
 Chronolytics Embedded Systems Platform Technologies 
 SmartQ MID Forum 

Mobile Linux
Mobile computers
Android (operating system) devices
Linux-based devices